David is the title of two statues of the biblical hero David by the Italian Early Renaissance sculptor Donatello. They consist of an early work in marble of a clothed figure (1408–09), and a far more famous bronze figure that is nude except for helmet and boots, and dates to the 1440s or later. Both are now in the Museo Nazionale del Bargello in Florence.

The biblical text 
The story of David and Goliath comes from 1 Samuel 17. The Israelites are fighting the Philistines, whose champion – Goliath – repeatedly offers to meet the Israelites' best warrior in single combat to decide the whole battle. None of the trained Israelite soldiers is brave enough to fight the giant Goliath, until David – a shepherd boy who is too young to be a soldier – accepts the challenge. Saul, the Israelite leader, offers David armour and weapons, but the boy is untrained and refuses them.  Instead, he goes out with his sling, and confronts the enemy. He hits Goliath in the head with a stone, knocking the giant down, and then grabs Goliath's sword and cuts off his head. The Philistines withdraw as agreed and the Israelites are saved.  David's special strength comes from God, and the story illustrates the triumph of good over evil.

The marble David

Donatello, then in his early twenties, was commissioned to carve a statue of David in 1408, to top one of the buttresses of Florence Cathedral, though it was never placed there. Nanni di Banco was commissioned to carve a marble statue of Isaiah, at the same scale, in the same year.  One of the statues was lifted into place in 1409, but was found to be too small to be easily visible from the ground and was taken down; both statues then languished in the workshop of the opera for several years.  In 1416, the Signoria of Florence commanded that the David be sent to the Palazzo della Signoria; evidently the young David was seen as an effective political symbol, as well as a religious hero. Donatello was asked to make some adjustments to the statue (perhaps to make him look less like a prophet), and a pedestal with an inscription was made for it:  ("To those who fight bravely for the fatherland the gods lend aid even against the most terrible foes").

The marble David is Donatello's earliest known important commission, and it is a work closely tied to tradition, giving few signs of the innovative approach to representation that the artist would develop as he matured. Although the positioning of the legs hints at a classical contrapposto, the figure stands in an elegant Gothic sway that derives from Lorenzo Ghiberti. The face is blank (that is, if one expects naturalism, but very typical of the International Gothic style), and David seems almost unaware of the head of his vanquished foe that rests between his feet.  Some scholars have seen an element of personality – a kind of cockiness – suggested by the twist of the torso and the akimbo placement of the left arm, but overall the effect of the figure is rather bland. The head of Goliath, lying at David's feet, "is carved with great assurance and reveals the sculptor's genuinely Renaissance interest in an ancient Roman type of mature, bearded head".

The bronze David 

Donatello's bronze statue (circa 1440s)  is famous as the first unsupported standing work of bronze cast during the Renaissance, and the first freestanding nude male sculpture made since antiquity.  It depicts David with an enigmatic smile, posed with his foot on Goliath's severed head just after defeating the giant. The youth is completely naked, apart from a laurel-topped hat and boots, and bears the sword of Goliath.

The creation of the work is undocumented. Most scholars assume the statue was commissioned by Cosimo de' Medici, but the date of its creation is unknown and widely disputed; suggested dates vary from the 1420s to the 1460s (Donatello died in 1466), with the majority opinion recently falling in the 1440s, when the new Medici Palace designed by Michelozzo was under construction. According to one theory, it was commissioned by the Medici family in the 1430s to be placed in the center of the courtyard of the old Medici Palace. Alternatively it may have been made for that position in the new Palazzo Medici, where it was placed later, which would place the commission in the mid-1440s or even later. The statue is only recorded there by 1469. The Medici family were exiled from Florence in 1494, and the statue was moved to the courtyard of the Palazzo della Signoria (the marble David was already in the palazzo).  It was moved to the Palazzo Pitti in the 17th century, to the Uffizi in 1777, and then finally, in 1865, to the Museo Nazionale del Bargello, where it remains today.

According to Vasari, the statue stood on a column designed by Desiderio da Settignano in the middle of the courtyard of the Palazzo Medici; an inscription seems to have explained the statue's significance as a political monument. A quattrocento manuscript containing the text of the inscription is probably an earlier reference to the statue; unfortunately the manuscript is not dated. Although a political meaning for the statue is widely accepted, what that meaning is has been a matter of considerable debate among scholars.

The iconography of the bronze David follows that of the marble David:  a young hero stands with sword in hand, the severed head of his enemy at his feet. Visually, however, this statue is startlingly different. David is both physically delicate and remarkably effeminate. The head has been said to have been inspired by classical sculptures of Antinous, a favourite of Hadrian renowned for his beauty. The statue's physique, contrasted with the large sword in hand, shows that David has overcome Goliath not by physical prowess, but through God. The boy's nakedness further implies the idea of the presence of God, contrasting the youth with the heavily-armoured giant. David is presented uncircumcised, which is customary for male nudes in Italian Renaissance art.

Controversy 

There are no indications of contemporary responses to the David. However, the fact that the statue was placed in the town hall of Florence in the 1490s indicates that it was not viewed as controversial. In the early 16th century, the Herald of the Signoria mentioned the sculpture in a way that suggested there was something unsettling about it: "The David in the courtyard is not a perfect figure because its right leg is tasteless." By mid-century Vasari was describing the statue as so naturalistic that it must have been made from life. However, among 20th- and 21st-century art historians there has been considerable controversy about how to interpret it.

Goliath's beard curls around David's sandaled foot, as if the young hero is running his toes through his dead opponent's hair. Goliath is wearing a winged helmet.  David's right foot stands firmly on the short right wing, while the left wing, considerably longer, works its way up his right leg to his groin.

The figure has been interpreted in a variety of ways.  One has been to suggest that Donatello was homosexual and that he was expressing that sexual attitude through this statue.  A second is to suggest that the work refers to homosocial values in Florentine society without expressing Donatello's personal tendencies. However, during the Renaissance sodomy was illegal, and over 14,000 men had been tried in Florence for this crime, so this homosexual implication would have been dangerous. A third interpretation is that David represents Donatello's effort to create a unique version of the male nude, to exercise artistic licence rather than copy the classical models that had thus far been the sources for the depiction of the male nude in Renaissance art.

Identification

The traditional identification of the figure was questioned in 1939 by Jeno Lanyi, with an interpretation leaning toward ancient mythology, the hero's helmet especially suggesting Hermes or Mercury. A number of scholars since have followed Lanyi, sometimes referring to the statue as David-Mercury. If the figure were indeed meant to represent Mercury, it may be supposed that he stands atop the head of the vanquished giant Argus Panoptes. However, all quattrocento references to the statue identify it as David.

Restoration
The statue underwent restoration from June 2007 to November 2008.  This was the first time the statue had ever been restored, but concerns about layers of "mineralised waxings" on the surface of the bronze led to the 18-month intervention. The statue was scraped with scalpels (on the non-gilded areas) and lasered (on the gilded areas) to remove surface build-up.

Copies and influence 
There is a full-size plaster cast (with a broken sword) in the Victoria and Albert Museum, London. There is also a full-size white marble copy in the Temperate House at the Royal Botanic Gardens, Kew, Surrey, a few miles outside central London. In addition to the copies in the United Kingdom, there is also another copy at the Slater Museum at the Norwich Free Academy in Norwich, Connecticut, United States. 

David continued to be a subject of great interest for Italian patrons and artists.  Later representations of the Biblical hero include Antonio del Pollaiuolo's David (Berlin, Staatliche Museen, c. 1470, panel painting), Verrocchio's David (Florence, Bargello, 1470s, bronze),  Domenico Ghirlandaio's David (Florence, S. Maria Novella, c. 1485, fresco), Bartolomeo Bellano's David (New York, Metropolitan Museum of Art, 1470s, bronze), Michelangelo's David (Florence, Accademia, 1501–1504, marble), and Bernini's David (Rome, Galleria Borghese, 1623–24, marble).

See also
David di Donatello film awards
Sculpture in the Renaissance Period

Notes and references

Bibliography
"Grove", Charles Avery and Sarah Blake McHam. "Donatello." Grove Art Online. Oxford Art Online. Oxford University Press, accessed June 16, 2015, subscription required

External links 

 Analysis, theme and critical reception
 Discussion and many detailed photos
 Two more angles
 Site with numerous image links
 White marble copy at Kew (part of a set on Flickr)

1440s works
Sculptures depicting David
Sculptures by Donatello
Sculptures of the Bargello
Nude sculptures